Our Lady of China, the Great Mother, also known as Our Lady of Donglü, is a Roman Catholic title of the Blessed Virgin Mary associated with an alleged Marian apparition in Donglü, China in 1900.

On 19 February 2021, Pope Francis granted a canonical coronation for a Marian image venerated at the National Shrine of Our Lady of China in Chiayi County, Taiwan, Republic of China. The coronation took place on 14 August 2022.

History

During the Boxer Rebellion, a great number of soldiers attacked the village of Donglü, Hebei. The village consisted of a small community of Christians founded by the Vincentian Order of priests. Pious legends claim that the Blessed Virgin Mary appeared in white, and a fiery horseman (believed to be Saint Michael the Archangel) who chased away the soldiers.

The local priest, Father Rene Flament of the Congregation of the Mission hired a local French painter in Shanghai to make a Marian statue similar to the Chinese dowager Empress Ci Xi. This image was based in the Marian image of “Our Lady of Laeken” venerated in the Church of Our Lady of Laeken in Brussels, Belgium. The Donglu statue was later destroyed in 1966 during the Cultural Revolution.

Accordingly, Donglu became a place of pilgrimage in 1924. The image was blessed and promulgated by Pope Pius XI in 1928. At the close of the 1924 Shanghai Synod of Bishops in China, the first national conference of bishops in the country, the Apostolic Chancellor, Cardinal Celso Costantini (剛 恆 毅), Apostolic Delegate in China, along with all the bishops of China, consecrated the Chinese people to the Blessed Virgin Mary. In 1941, Pope Pius XII designated the feast day as an official feast of the Catholic liturgical calendar.

In 1973, the Chinese Bishops' conference, upon approval from the Holy See, placed the feast day on the vigil (day preceding) of Mothers Day (the second Sunday of May).

In 1989, a painted canvas of the same Madonna with Child Jesus dressed in golden imperial robes was recreated, now enshrined at the altar of the parish.

Alternatively in 1976, another statue was reconstructed in Taiwan now venerated in the “National Shrine of Our Lady of China”, which was constructed in 1913.

In 2020, the former Bishop of Chiayi Thomas Chung An-Zu requested a coronation for the Marian image, which was granted and merited a decree of pontifical coronation from Pope Francis on 19 February 2021. The decree was released to the Taiwanese media on 2 March 2021. The image is then crowned on 14 August 2022.

Veneration and controversy

A mosaic rendition of Our Lady of China exists within the Basilica of the National Shrine of the Immaculate Conception in Washington D.C. established in 2002.

Controversy arose due to the Marian iconography not being officially sanctioned by the Holy Office for religious propagation. Adding more political issues, a Chinese cardinal, Thomas Tien Keng-Hsin, sanctioned this variant image for a religious prayer card for the persecuted in China, and was widely promoted in America and Canada.

References

Citations

Notes

Sources 

 https://web.archive.org/web/20050425130840/http://www.udayton.edu/mary/resources/olchina.html
http://www.catholicculture.org/docs/doc_view.cfm?recnum=3172

External links
 Our Lady of China Pastoral Mission, Washington, D.C.

Catholicism in China
China, Our Lady of
Titles of Mary